Garango is a city located in Boulgou Province of Burkina Faso. The main ethnic group is the Bissa. The population  is 40,404.

International relations

Twin towns – Sister cities
Garango is twinned with:
  Laval, France
 Ladenburg, Germany

References

Populated places in the Centre-Ouest Region
Boulgou Province

de:Garango
pl:Garango
ro:Garango
sv:Garango